The 1997 Philadelphia Wings season marked the team's eleventh season of operation.

Game log
Reference:

(p) - denotes playoff game

Roster

See also
 Philadelphia Wings
 1997 MILL season

References

Philadelphia Wings seasons
1997 in lacrosse
Philly